A jambiya, also spelled janbiya, jambya, jambia and janbia ( janbīyyah), also known as a shibriyeh ( shibriyyah) in the Levant, is a specific type of dagger with a short curved blade with a medial ridge that originated from the Hadhramaut region of Yemen. They have spread to other countries in the Middle East, to other countries in the Arab world (Somalia), and to parts of South Asia and Southeast Asia. Men typically above the age of 14 wear it as an accessory to their clothing.

Types

The jambiya were taken by travelers to other cultures including the Ottoman Empire, Persia and India, where they were adopted with slight differences to the blade, hilt and scabbard.

Hilt or handle

A significant part of a jambiya is its hilt (handle). The saifani hilt is made of rhinoceros horn, which can cost up to $1500 per kilogram. It is used on the daggers of wealthier citizens. Different versions of saifani hilts can be distinguished by their colour. Other janbiya hilts are made of a different types of horn, wood, metal and ivory from elephants and walrus. Apart from the material used for the hilt, the design and detail is a measure of its value and the status of its owner.

Blade, sheath and belt

The double edged blade of the jambiya is constructed of steel which in some cases is damascus or wootz steel. The blade is stored in a sheath known as 'Asib, usually made of wood covered with metal, leather or cloth. The sheath can be decorated with various ornaments that signify status. These include silver work, semi-precious stones, and leather. The sheath can be fixed to a leather belt, which is normally 2–3 inches wide. The belt is usually worn around the lower abdomen. There are often other items attached to this belt, such as a silver purse for containing money and change. Sometimes, Jambiyas are made from shrapnel left over from missiles in a war.

Use

Despite the cultural significance of the jambiya, it is still a weapon. Although people have used it in times of dispute, there are societal norms that must be followed in order to avoid defamation. The jambiya should only come out of its sheath in extreme cases of conflict. It is also commonly used in traditional events, such as dances.

Like with some other curved knives, as the blade bends towards the opponent, the user need not angle the wrist, which makes it more comfortable as a stabbing weapon than straight-bladed knives. Its heavy blade enables the user to inflict deep wounds.

Yemeni jambia

A jambia is a short dagger worn by men in Yemen. The handle of a jambiya tells the status of the man who wears it.

Structure and make

The jambia was given its name because it is worn on the side of a person – the word jambia is derived from the Arabic word "jamb" which mean "side". A jambia is constituted of a handle, a blade, and a sheath in which the blade is held. It is made of a certain sort of wood, to hold the blade that is fixed to the waist from underneath with an upward curved sheath. The belt that holds the jambia is made of tanned leather, or some thick cloth. There are specialised markets and handicraft markets that decorate it with golden wires.

The jambia handle often tells of the social status of the man who wears it. Jambias were often made with ivory handles.  The manufacturers most often receive this material through smugglers, due to the international ban on the substance. As ivory has only ever had ornamental merit in such an application, those that recognize the jambia as a tool and/or weapon tend to prefer a hardwood handle anyway.  Many street-side charlatans will proclaim to sell ivory-handled jambias whilst actually selling poorly-made blades with white plastic handles.

Qualities

The most famous sort of the jambia is that which has a "saifani" or ivory handle. It has a dim yellowish lustre. The more translucent ivory will turn a yellow colour with age. This is called "saifani heart". Some of the ivory handles are called "asadi", when they turn into greenish yellow. When the handle becomes whitish yellow, it is called "zaraf". There is also an albasali (onionish), kind whose colour resembles that of a white onion.

The ivory handle jambia is often worn as a sign of high social status. They are typically used by most Yemeni people, except those in the city of Aden where most of them have given up using it. The Jambiya hasn't been specialized for a particular person in the country, but the valuable ones can be found with a particular persons, like judges, famous merchants and businessmen.

Antique jambias that have been worn by historic persons can fetch exorbitant prices, like that of the Sheikh of the Bakils, Sheikh Al-Shaif, which goes back to Imam Yahya Muhammad Hamid ed-Din and was reported to have cost US$1,000,000 when bought in 1992.

Popular culture
 T. E. Lawrence was famous for using a jambiya knife historically. He was portrayed using one in the 1962 film Lawrence of Arabia, the 1989 book Lawrence of Arabia: The Authorised Biography of T. E. Lawrence, the 1990 television film A Dangerous Man: Lawrence After Arabia, and the documentary Deadliest Warrior.
 Aladdin owns a jambiya left by his father, and uses it to fight Sa'Luk in the 1996 film Aladdin and the King of Thieves.
 Geralt of Rivia owns a dagger that resembles a jambiya in the 2007 game The Witcher.
 Ezio Auditore wields a jambiya in Assassin's Creed: Revelations.
 Kratos can find a Jambiya in God of War: Ragnarök.

See also

 Khanjar
 Keris
 Jile
 Lawrence of Arabia

References

Sources

External links 

 
 

Arab culture
Arab inventions
Daggers